René Brodmann (25 October 1933 – 2000) was a Swiss football defender who played for Switzerland in the 1966 FIFA World Cup. He also played for Grasshopper Club Zürich, FC Zürich, and FC St. Gallen. He died in 2000.

References

External links
FIFA profile

1933 births
2000 deaths
Swiss men's footballers
Switzerland international footballers
Association football defenders
Grasshopper Club Zürich players
FC Zürich players
FC St. Gallen players
1966 FIFA World Cup players
Swiss football managers
FC Zürich managers
FC St. Gallen managers
Sportspeople from Basel-Landschaft